Seabourn may refer to:

 Seabourn Cruise Line, American cruise line
 Bert Seabourn (1931–2022), American expressionist painter

See also
 Seaborn, a surname and given name 
 Seaborne (disambiguation)
 Seabourne, a surname 
 Seaburn, a seaside resort in England